The Penghu Guanyin Temple (also "Guan-Yin-Ting", meaning "the pavilion of Guanyin")  is a Buddhist temple, like other temples which belongs to the Integration of Buddhism and Taoism in Taiwan, Guanyin Temple does not only serve Guanyin (Buddhist God), but also Long-Wang. (龍王 in Chinese, a Taoist God, means the Lord of Sea Dragon.)

This temple was founded in 1696 during the Qing dynasty, the founder is Xue Kui (薛奎), a military officer of Penghu Navy (澎湖水師協). It is located at the noted touristic attraction, close to the beach area. Since 2003, Guan-Yin-Ting would gather thousands of visitors from everywhere for attending the Firework Festival from April to June.

Chronology

See also  
 Penghu Mazu Temple
 Magong Chenghuang Temple
 Magong Beiji Temple
 Penghu Shuixian Temple
 List of temples in Taiwan

References

Buddhist temples in Taiwan
Temples in Penghu County